Roswell G. "Little Hig" Higginbotham (August 15, 1898 – May 25, 1943) was an American football and baseball player and coach.  He died on May 25, 1943 at Naval Air Station Quonset Point. He was the younger brother of Grady Higginbotham.

Head coaching record

References

External links
 
 

1898 births
1943 deaths
American football halfbacks
Baseball shortstops
Austin Kangaroos baseball coaches
Austin Kangaroos football coaches
Paris Snappers players
SMU Mustangs baseball coaches
SMU Mustangs football coaches
Texas A&M Aggies baseball coaches
Texas A&M Aggies baseball players
Texas A&M Aggies football players
People from Grayson County, Texas
Players of American football from Texas
Baseball players from Texas